Alfred Edmond Bourgeois (October 26, 1872 – January 24, 1939) was a Canadian Liberal Party politician who represented the riding of Kent. He ran in the Kent by-election in 1923 and 1930 but was defeated in both.

External links
 

1872 births
1939 deaths
Liberal Party of Canada MPs
Members of the House of Commons of Canada from New Brunswick